The 1918–19 Gold Cup was the 7th edition of the Gold Cup, a cup competition in Irish football.

The tournament was won by Linfield for the third time.

Group standings

References

1918–19 in Irish association football